The 1946 Rutgers Queensmen football team represented Rutgers University in the 1946 college football season. Rutgers was in its fifth non-consecutive season under head coach Harvey Harman.  Harman had coached Rutgers from 1938 to 1941, but missed the 1942 to 1945 seasons while serving as a lieutenant commander in the United States Navy.  The 1946 team compiled a 7–2 record, won the Middle Three Conference championship, and outscored its opponents 252 to 48. The team's only losses came against Columbia (7–13) and Princeton (7–14).

Schedule

References

Rutgers
Rutgers Scarlet Knights football seasons
Rutgers Queensmen football